Igor Borisovich Frenkel (born April 22, 1952) is a Russian-American mathematician at Yale University working in representation theory and mathematical physics.

Frenkel emigrated to the United States in 1979. He received his PhD from Yale University in 1980 with a dissertation on the "Orbital Theory for Affine Lie Algebras".  He held positions at the IAS and MSRI, and a tenured professorship at Rutgers University, before taking his current job of tenured professor at Yale University. He was elected to the National Academy of Sciences in 2018. He is also a Fellow of the American Academy of Arts and Sciences.

Mathematical work

In collaboration with James Lepowsky and Arne Meurman, he constructed the monster vertex algebra, a vertex algebra which provides a representation of the monster group.

Around 1990, as a member of the School of Mathematics at the Institute for Advanced Study, Frenkel worked on the mathematical theory of knots, hoping to develop a theory in which the knot would be seen as a physical object. He continued to develop the idea with his student Mikhail Khovanov, and their collaboration ultimately led to the discovery of Khovanov homology, a refinement of the Jones polynomial, in 2002.

A detailed description of Igor Frenkel's research over the years can be found in

References

External links
Home page

1952 births
Living people
20th-century American mathematicians
Rutgers University faculty
Yale University faculty
Mathematicians from Saint Petersburg
Fellows of the American Academy of Arts and Sciences
Members of the United States National Academy of Sciences